Sergiu Adrian Oltean (born 24 July 1987) is a Romanian footballer who plays for Hungarian NB II club Kazincbarcikai SC as a centre-back. In his career, Oltean also played for teams such as: Liberty Salonta, Bihor Oradea, FC Brașov, FC Botoșani or Kisvárda FC, among others.

References

External links
 
 

People from Salonta
Living people
1987 births
Romanian footballers
Association football defenders
Liga I players
FC Brașov (1936) players
FC Botoșani players
Liga II players
CF Liberty Oradea players
FC Bihor Oradea players
CS Minaur Baia Mare (football) players
Cigánd SE players
Kisvárda FC players
Kazincbarcikai SC footballers
Romanian expatriate footballers
Expatriate footballers in Hungary
Romanian expatriate sportspeople in Hungary